St. Gabriel's Priory, formerly St. Gabriel's Abbey, is a Benedictine nunnery in Sankt Johann bei Herberstein, Styria, Austria.

History
The community was founded as a priory in 1889 in Smíchov, now part of Prague, and was raised to the rank of an abbey in 1893. St. Gabriel's was the first women's community to join the Beuronese Congregation within the Benedictine Confederation. After World War I, the predominantly German-speaking community relocated from the newly-independent Czechoslovakia to Schloss Bertholdstein, a castle in Pertlstein in the present municipality of Fehring  in Styria.

In 1942, the nunnery was commandeered by the National Socialists; the nuns were expelled and were unable to return until 1946.

In October 2007 the nuns joined the Federation of Sisters of St. Lioba and, as a priory once again, moved to Sankt Johann bei Herberstein in the municipality of Feistritztal, Styria, in November 2008.

The main source of income of the community is from making vestments and church embroidery and taking care of guests.

References

Further reading
 Ulrike-Johanna Wagner-Höher: Die Benediktinerinnen von St. Gabriel / Bertholdstein (1889–1919). Eos-Verlag, St. Ottilien 2008
 Inge Steinsträßer: Wanderer zwischen den politischen Mächten. Pater Nikolaus von Lutterotti OSB (1892–1955) und die Abtei Grüssau in Niederschlesien. Böhlau Verlag 2009, p. 72 (fn. 4), p. 77 (fn. 31), p. 87 (fn. 79)

Benedictine monasteries in Austria
Monasteries in Styria
Benedictine nunneries in Austria
1889 establishments in Austria-Hungary
Establishments in the Duchy of Styria